Viersen is an electoral constituency (German: Wahlkreis) represented in the Bundestag. It elects one member via first-past-the-post voting. Under the current constituency numbering system, it is designated as constituency 111. It is located in western North Rhine-Westphalia, comprising the district of Viersen.

Viersen was created for the inaugural 1949 federal election. Since 2021, it has been represented by Martin Plum of the Christian Democratic Union (CDU).

Geography
Viersen is located in western North Rhine-Westphalia. As of the 2021 federal election, it is coterminous with the Viersen district.

History
Viersen was created in 1949, then known as Kempen-Krefeld. It acquired its current name in the 1980 election. In the 1949 election, it was North Rhine-Westphalia constituency 24 in the numbering system. From 1953 through 1961, it was number 83. From 1965 through 1976, it was number 81. From 1980 through 1998, it was number 80. From 2002 through 2009, it was number 112. Since 2013, it has been number 111.

Originally, the constituency comprised the district of Kempen-Krefeld. In the 1972 and 1976 elections, it comprised the Kempen-Krefeld district (renamed to the Viersen district in 1974) excluding the city of Viersen. Since 1980, it has comprised the entirety of the Viersen district.

Members
The constituency has been held continuously by the Christian Democratic Union (CDU) since 1949. It was first represented by Matthias Hoogen from 1949 to 1965, followed by Hugo Hammans from then until 1980. Julius Louven then served from 1980 to 2002. Uwe Schummer was elected in 2002, and re-elected in 2005, 2009, 2013, and 2017. He was succeeded by Martin Plum in 2021.

Election results

2021 election

2017 election

2013 election

2009 election

References

Federal electoral districts in North Rhine-Westphalia
1949 establishments in West Germany
Constituencies established in 1949
Viersen (district)